The 14205 / 14206 Faizabad–Delhi Express is a train which runs between Faizabad and Old Delhi. Though there are several trains that run to Delhi via Faizabad railway station, Faizabad–Delhi Express is the only train which starts at Faizabad Jn. to Delhi Jn. It runs daily from Faizabad to Delhi and from Delhi to Faizabad.

Route & Halts

Traction
It is hauled by a Lucknow-based WDM-3D locomotive for entire journey.

Rake sharing
The train sharing its rake with 14207/14208 Padmavat Express.

Timings

From Faizabad to Old Delhi

From Old Delhi to Faizabad

See also
 Saket Express
 Faizabad Superfast Express
 Faizabad railway station
 Ayodhya railway station

References

Trains from Faizabad
Railway services introduced in 1992
Express trains in India
Rail transport in Delhi